Kyrgyzstan participated in, and won, the Turkvision Song Contest 2015 in Istanbul, Turkey. The song "Kim bilet", performed by Jiidesh İdirisova, was selected as the Kyrgyzstani entry for the contest in a national final.

Background

The country's best result was in 2014, when the song "Seze bil", performed by Non-Stop, placed 4th in the final with 196 points.

Before Turkvision
Kyrgyzstani broadcaster KTRK confirmed the country's participation in the contest on 1 June 2015.

National final
KTRK organised a national final to select the Kyrgyzstani entry for the contest, with submissions opening on 19 October 2015. The selection consisted of a single show on 22 November 2015.

Artist and song information

Winner 

The winner of the 2015 Turkvision song Contest was Jiidesh İdirisova who represented her country with the song "Kim bilet".

Kim bilet 

"Kim bilet" is a song recorded by Kyrgyzstani singer Jiidesh İdirisova, and written by Kıyalbek Urmanbetov. The song won the Turkvision Song Contest 2015 representing Kyrgyzstan.

References

Countries in the Turkvision Song Contest 2015
2015
Turkvision